A-86929 is a synthetic compound that acts as a selective dopamine receptor D1 agonist. It was developed as a possible treatment for Parkinson's disease, as well as for other applications such as treatment of cocaine addiction, but while it had reasonable efficacy in humans it also caused dyskinesias and has not been continued. It has mainly been used as its diacetate ester prodrug adrogolide (ABT-431), which has better bioavailability.

References

D1-receptor agonists
Thiophenes
Catechols